Micropholis brochidodroma is a species of plant in the family Sapotaceae. It is endemic to Peru.

References

Trees of Peru
brochidodroma
Vulnerable plants
Taxonomy articles created by Polbot